Risley Hall can mean:
Risley Hall, Derbyshire, now a hotel
John Risley Hall at Dalhousie University, Halifax, Nova Scotia, Canada
Risley Residential College at Cornell University in Ithaca, New York, USA

Architectural disambiguation pages